Mid-credits and post-credits scenes have been used in various Marvel Cinematic Universe (MCU) media, since the beginning of the franchise with the 2008 film Iron Man. The use of such scenes as a whole has changed movie-goer expectations, and has received both praise and criticism. Individual scenes have been widely discussed, ranked, and criticized. In some cases, MCU films have multiple mid-credits and post-credits scenes, and MCU television series have employed them after some episodes. As of Ant-Man and the Wasp: Quantumania (2023), the MCU has featured 73 post-credits scenes across 41 properties.

History 
The first post-credits scene involving Marvel Comics characters occurred prior to the MCU, in the 2006 film X-Men: The Last Stand, showing Charles Xavier / Professor X to be alive after his apparent death by the hands of the Phoenix earlier in the film. This has been described as "Marvel's first post-credit scene".

The MCU has made extensive use of mid- and post-credit scenes (often both) which typically serve as a teaser for a future Marvel Studios film. For example, the post-credits scene of Iron Man 2 (2010) shows S.H.I.E.L.D. agent Phil Coulson locating a large hammer at the bottom of a crater in a New Mexico desert, thus teasing the release of Thor the following year; while the post-credits sequence of Captain America: The Winter Soldier (2014) introduces the characters of Pietro and Wanda Maximoff, who join the franchise in Avengers: Age of Ultron (2015). Other times these mid- and post-credits scenes serve primarily as gags, such as the post-credits scene in The Avengers (2012), which has the team eating shawarma in a derelict restaurant in the aftermath of the film's climactic battle, or Spider-Man: Homecoming (2017), which features Captain America educating the audience on patience.

The Incredible Hulk (2008) does not include a proper post-credits scene; however, its final scene, in which Tony Stark approaches Thaddeus Ross in a bar, is often treated as one. Avengers: Endgame (2019) also does not feature a post-credits scene, instead having the credits end with the sound of clanging metal first heard in Iron Man. In addition to such scenes attached to films, the MCU has had post-credit scenes in most MCU television series, generally after the final episode of the series. The ubiquity of post-credit scenes in MCU properties was such that the producers of the television special Werewolf by Night (2022) felt the need to defend the absence of such a scene, noting that the final scene of the show itself had a feeling much like a typical post-credits scene, and that the characters were left not knowing what the future will bring.

Scenes 
The following table covers scenes featured in films, short films, television series, animated shorts, and television specials produced by Marvel Studios, and are organized chronologically by original release date.

List indicators

Phase One

Phase Two

Phase Three

Phase Four

Phase Five

Reception 
The MCU has been described as having "made the post-credits scene commonplace", and as being the media that "uses them to the greatest effect", and having "reset moviegoers' expectations about when a film is actually over". Post-credit scenes often contain humor, or Easter eggs referencing matters ranging from the significant to the obscure that would be of interest to fans of the media. Peter Cullen Bryan "examines the interplay within modern superhero blockbusters, which grants the geek a degree of social power: Marvel’s use of the post-credits scene is indicative of the larger process, creating a ritual enacted by fans, who interpret the scene for the uninitiated". In the MCU, these scenes often "tease future plotlines and characters that will be introduced down the road".

Post-credit scenes have also often been used in the MCU to highlight new releases that are still forthcoming at the time that the media containing the post-credit scene is released, a practice that has been criticized as detracting from the importance of the films to which the scenes are attached. Such scenes are also criticized on the grounds that they usurp meaningful film endings with cheap gags; a review in The Guardian stated that "if you can't find a way to incorporate it into the actual movie instead of ruining its afterglow, maybe it wasn't meant to be in there". A 2022 review in Total Film observed that "[t]he recent wave of Marvel post-credits scenes do not seemingly lead into any known sequel, instead offering a scattergun approach to the future".

The post-credit scene for the MCU television series, Hawkeye (2021) finale, "So This Is Christmas?", features the cast of the fictional Rogers: the Musical performing the number, "Save the City", first seen in a shorter form in the premiere episode. At over four minutes, this was the longest post-credits scene of any MCU production to date, and was received with sharply divided opinions by fans, as it did not advance any MCU storyline. Guardians of the Galaxy Vol. 2 (2017) and the television series She-Hulk: Attorney at Law (2022) are the projects with the largest number of post-credit scenes, featuring five, with She-Hulk including them in the first four episodes and the final episode.

Collider ranked the MCU credit scenes, initially in May 2021, with their top five being Iron Mans, the mid- and post-credits of The Avengers, The First Avengers, and the mid-credits of The Winter Soldier.

Marvel Comics characters outside the MCU 
A number of films, television series, and other media not occurring in the MCU, but featuring characters from Marvel Comics, have also had post-credit scenes. In some cases, the relationship between these properties is blurred because the characters have later appeared in the MCU, or because the post-credit scenes themselves implicate events in the MCU.

Marvel films outside the MCU 
In X-Men: The Last Stand (2006), Charles Xavier is shown to be alive after his apparent death by the hands of the Phoenix earlier in the film. Screen Rant later described this as "Marvel's first post-credit scene", and noted that this is one of several significant post-credits scenes that were not followed up on in later films.

The post-credits scene in Deadpool (2016) featured the title character appearing in a bathrobe and telling the audience that the movie is over—identical to the post-credits scene in the 1986 comedy, Ferris Bueller's Day Off—while also saying "What are you expecting Sam Jackson to show up in a eye patch?", referencing the appearance of Nick Fury in the Iron Man post-credits scene. Deadpool also announces to the audience that the sequel will include Cable.

In the Sony's Spider-Man Universe (SSU) film Venom: Let There Be Carnage (2021), Eddie Brock and Venom decide to take a tropical vacation while they ponder their next steps. As Venom tells Brock about the symbiotes' knowledge of other universes, a blinding light transports them from their hotel room to another room where they watch J. Jonah Jameson talk about Spider-Man's identity as Peter Parker on television, as was previously revealed in Spider-Man: Far From Home. Similarly, in Morbius (2022), the first mid-credits scene features Adrian Toomes finding himself transported to the SSU, while in the second, Toomes approaches Dr. Michael Morbius, suggesting they should form a team.

Other media outside the MCU 
In Lego Marvel's Avengers (2016), a video game primarily based on the plot of The Avengers and Avengers: Age of Ultron, there are a number of MCU-inspired scenes during the credits. The first scene parodies the mid-credits scene from The Avengers, though with Thanos playing various 'Awesome Mix' cassette tapes. The second scene parodies the post-credits scene from that film, with the Avengers sitting around a restaurant table, but with the Hulk hoarding the available food. The third scene shows Stan Lee as a janitor cleaning up the aftermath of Ultron's attack on Avengers Tower in Age of Ultron. He lifts Mjölnir and accidentally causes a blast of lightning. The fourth and final scene parodies the mid-credits scene of that film, with Thanos taking the Infinity Gauntlet out of a washing machine.

The Good, the Bart, and the Loki, a 2021 Disney+ short featuring The Simpsons and tied into the first season of Loki, features a mid-credits scene of Loki disguised as Moe Szyslak giving patrons at Moe's Tavern free drinks. In two post-credits scenes, Ralph Wiggum as the Hulk smashes Loki similarly to a scene from The Avengers, and Loki stands before Ravonna Renslayer at the Time Variance Authority, where she finds him guilty of his various crimes, such as crossing over to the Simpsons universe. A review noted that the scene "pokes fun at the MCU post-credits scenes with an extended credits reel that hides a good couple of reference heavy clips".

See also 
List of films with post-credits scenes

References 

Marvel Cinematic Universe lists